Maciej Dąbrowski (born 11 February 1994) is a Polish male badminton player.

Achievements

BWF International Challenge/Series
Men's Doubles

 BWF International Challenge tournament
 BWF International Series tournament
 BWF Future Series tournament

References

External links 

Living people
1994 births
Polish male badminton players
Place of birth missing (living people)